The Schweizer SA 2-31 was a development of the Schweizer SA 1-30 into a two-seat aircraft.

Design and development
Schweizer developed a line of gliders starting in World War II. The 2-31 was not intended to be a motor glider, but rather a light aircraft utilizing some glider and sailplane technologies, common parts with other Schweizer designs and an affordable price as a result of using smaller powerplants. It was developed from the SA 1-30 on the assumption that there would be more  of a market for a two-seat aircraft. The fuselage was based on that of the 1-30 with strengthened 1-26B wings.

Operational history
The prototype first flew in July 1960, but the type was not put into production because it was thought that the cost of setting up a production line would be too great to compete with other two-seat aircraft available at the time.

Specifications (Schweizer SA 2-31)

References

Schweizer aircraft
Single-engined tractor aircraft
Aircraft first flown in 1960